Do Lachhian is a 1960 (sometimes written 1959) Punjabi film directed by Jugal Kishore, starring Gopal Sehgal, Daljeet, Indira Billi and Krishna Kumari in lead roles.

Synopsis 
Do Lachhian is a romantic drama. Two girls, Lachhi (Waddhi Lachhi) and Chhoti Lachhi, the daughters of Dharmu and Karmu, respectively, are in love with Labbhu and Sohna, respectively. Labbhu and his friend Natthu are alcoholic thieves and have a little crime record. A moneylender, Bhainge Shah, also wants to marry Chhoti Lachhi, and for this purpose he manages a fight between Dharmu and Karmu and so between Lachhi and Chhoti Lachhi with the help of Labbhu and Natthu. Bhainge Shah, taking advantage of the fight, manages a marriage with Chhoti Lachhi but at the time his servant, Jagga, an admirer of Lachhi's beauty, reveals the truth to Lachhi and she, apologising for their misunderstanding, saves the marriage reaching in time. Labbhu also realises his mistake and apologise. So the lovers meet.

Music 
The music is composed by Hansraj Behl and lyrics written by Verma Malik playback by Mohammad Rafi, Shamshad Begum and Lata Mangeshkar. Some of the hit numbers include haye ni mera baalam, hai barha zalim and teri kanak di rakhi by Shamshad Begum.

Track list
Ik Pind Do Lachhian
Haye Ni Mera Baalam, Hai Bra Zaalim, Shamshad Begum and Lata Mangeshkar
Bhaven Bol Tey Bhaven Na Bol, Wey Channa Bas Akhian De Kol, Shamshad Begum
O Majjh Gaan Walia, Balbir Singh
Gora Rang Na Ho Jave Kaala (Bolian style on Visakhi Mela)
Teri Kanak Di Rakhi Mundia, Hun Mein Nahion Behndi, Shamshad Begum
Sari Umraan De Pae Gaye Vichhorey, Mohammad Rafi, Shamshad Begum
Gur Khaandi Tey Naale Ganne Chupdi, Shamshad Begum

Cast

See also 
Lachhi
Bhangra
Satluj De Kandhe
Kankan De Ohle
Kaude Shah

References 

1960 films
Punjabi-language Indian films
Indian black-and-white films
1960s Punjabi-language films